Jesse & Joy is a Mexican pop duo formed in 2005 by brother and sister Jesse (born December 31, 1982, as Jesse Eduardo Huerta Uecke) and Joy (born June 20, 1986, as Tirzah Joy Huerta Uecke), in Mexico City. The duo have released five studio albums, one live album and one EP on Warner Music Latin, have toured internationally, and have accumulated a Best Latin Pop Album Grammy Award and six Latin Grammy Awards in various categories.

"Jesse & Joy are probably some of the purest, most talented artists of our generation," wrote Latin Times.

Early life and career

The Huerta Uecke siblings were born in Mexico City to a Mexican father and an American mother. In 2001, inspired by their parents' love for classic, rock and folk music, when they were 18 and 15 years old, respectively, they began writing music and songs with their father using instruments from his church, which they attended when they were young.

Jesse & Joy signed with the Warner Music Latina group on April 18, 2005. Jesse plays piano and guitar, while Joy plays guitar, drums and is the lead vocalist.

Esta Es Mi Vida
Introduced by the duo Sin Bandera at the 2005 Mexican Teletón, Jesse & Joy released their debut album Esta Es Mi Vida in 2006 through Warner Music Mexico. Their debut single, "Espacio Sideral", was certified gold by the Asociación Mexicana de Productores de Fonogramas y Videogramas (AMPROFON). The album reached the top twenty on the Mexican Album Chart, was certified platinum by the AMPROFON, and helped the duo to win the Latin Grammy Award for Best New Artist the next year.

Esto Es Lo Que Soy and Electricidad
In 2008, the duo released the Esto Es Lo Que Soy EP featuring "Espacio Sideral", "Ya No Quiero", "Volveré", "Llegaste Tú", and a new song called "Esto Es Lo Que Soy".

In 2009, their second studio album, Electricidad, was released. The album was certified gold by the AMPROFON and included singles "Adiós" and "Chocolate".

¿Con Quién Se Queda El Perro?
¿Con Quién Se Queda El Perro? was released as their third studio album in 2011. The album was certified 2× platinum, and included singles "Me Voy", "¡Corre!" and "La de la Mala Suerte". It received six Latin Grammy Awards and five nominations, as well as the group's first Grammy Award nomination for Best Latin Pop Album.

At the 2012 Latin Grammy Awards, Jesse & Joy were nominated for four Grammy Awards, winning three of them: Best Contemporary Pop Album for ¿Con Quién Se Queda El Perro?, and Song and Record of the Year for "¡Corre!". Additionally, together with Carlos López Estrada they received the Latin Grammy Award for Best Short Form Music Video for directing "Me Voy". On December 5, 2012, ¿Con Quién Se Queda El Perro? received a Grammy Award nomination for Best Latin Pop Album.

Un Besito Más, Jesse & Joy

At the end of 2015, the pop duo released their fourth studio album titled “Un Besito Más ,” which went to Number One on the Latin Albums Chart. The group toured the United States, Latin America, and Spain to support the album, as well as solidifying their base with shows in Latin America. The album, produced by Fraser T Smith and Martin Terefe (Jason Mraz, James Morrison, and Shawn Mendes), included the song, "Un Besito Mas", which Jesse & Joy wrote after their father's death and is depicted in the video highlighting the US immigration issues.

Un Besito Mas earned four Latin Grammy Award nominations (in the categories of Record of the year, Album of the Year, Song of the Year and Best Contemporary Pop Album). That year, Jesse & Joy performed as part of the Latin Recording Academy's  “Person of the Year” Gala honoring Roberto Carlos. The album, Un Besito Mas went on to win the Latin Grammy (2016) for Best Pop Vocal Album.

The release, shortly after, of their first-ever English songs, "Echoes of Love" and "More Than Amigos", extended the band's reach to the United Kingdom when the songs were playlisted on BBC Radio 1.

The Independent in the UK described album opener "Echoes of Love" as “true to their Latin/folk roots while introducing distinctly Adele-style epicness to the vocals”.

In mid-2016, Jesse & Joy gained mainstream attention with the release of their first dual-language album, Jesse & Joy which contained English versions of songs from their past four studio releases and biggest hits such as “Corre! (Run!)”,  “Espacio Sideral (Outer Space)", "Ecos de Amor (Echoes of Love)”, among others. The English/Spanish album was a logical step for the siblings, as Jesse later said: "I was blessed to be raised in a bi-cultural home. It showed me, from a young age, the beauty and power that lies in diversity, and working with my sister every day I experience the power that lies in unity: ‘Together we are stronger.’ All it takes is a little more time to understand and learn from one another."

At the 2017 American Grammy Award ceremony they received further mainstream recognition with their first-ever Grammy Award for Best Latin Pop Album honoring Un Besito Más, and in Joy's acceptance speech she dedicated the achievement to "all the Hispanics out there."

Jesse & Joy rounded out 2017 with appearances at the Latin American Music Awards, and at the Latin Grammy's "Person of the Year Gala" honoring Alejandro Sanz.

With their live Un Besito Más Tour, Jesse & Joy visited more than 15 countries and nearly 100 cities, including Buenos Aires, Madrid, Barcelona, Santiago de Chile, New York and Los Angeles.

In 2018, Jesse & Joy embarked on another international tour, beginning at Chile’s Viña Del Mar Festival, followed by the band’s homecoming to Mexico City's Arena Ciudad de Mexico.

The duo received the 2018 Vision Award that September at the 31st Annual Hispanic Heritage Awards, which aired on PBS that month. The award recognizes Latinos with major contributions in music.

Aire
The two artists signed a deal with Kobalt Music for their worldwide publishing beginning with their 2018 single, "Te Esperé".

In April 2019, Jesse & Joy collaborated with Colombian singer J Balvin for the single, "Mañana es Too Late.” The song was written by the duo, along with Poo Bear (who has worked with David Guetta, Matoma, Justin Bieber, Mariah Carey, Skrillex, Juanes, Jennifer Lopez, Fifth Harmony) and produced by Jesse and Charlie Heat (Kanye West, Madonna). "Mañana es Too Late" reached #1 in Mexico.

Throughout May 2019, Jesse & Joy toured Mexico including another sold-out performance at Auditorio Nacional.
 
Joy was recognized by the Latin Recording Academy as one at the Leading Ladies of Entertainment at a gala June 2019 that took place in Mexico City. The honor, for Latinas who "during their lives have demonstrated enthusiasm, determination, leadership, pride in their roots and an indomitable spirit in continuous form," that included Tatiana Bilboa, Martha de Bayle, Alondra de la Parra, and Soumaya Slim Domit.

Jesse & Joy continue to tour in 2019, with shows in Latin American and the United States.

Aire was released on June 5, 2020.

Clichés
On May 6, 2022, Jesse & Joy released a new album.

Personal lives
In the beginning of 2019, Joy publicly came out as pansexual and announced she had been married to her wife, Diana Atri, for 7 years. In May, Atri gave birth to their daughter, Noah. In March 2021, she announced the birth of their second child, a son named Nour.

Jesse is married to his wife Monica, with whom he has two daughters: Hanna and Abby.

Philanthropy
Jesse & Joy maintain an ongoing partnership with UnidosUS (formerly NCLR), the Hispanic civil rights and advocacy organization, and their “Electrify The Vote!". They performed acoustic shows in California, Texas, and Arizona intended to mobilize Latinos to vote. In addition, the musicians initiated personal recovery efforts following earthquakes in Mexico.

Discography

Studio albums

Extended plays

Live albums

Singles

Other songs

Year-end charts

Singles certification

Awards and nominations

Grammy Awards
The Grammy Award is an accolade by the National Academy of Recording Arts and Sciences of the United States to recognize outstanding achievement on the music industry.

|-
| 2013 || ¿Con Quién Se Queda El Perro? || rowspan=2|Best Latin Pop Album || 
|-
|2017 || Un Besito Más ||

Latin Grammy Awards
A Latin Grammy Award is an accolade by the Latin Academy of Recording Arts & Sciences to recognize outstanding achievement in the music industry.

|-
| rowspan=2| 2007 || Jesse & Joy || Best New Artist || 
|-
| Esta Es Mi Vida || Best Pop Album by a Duo or Group with Vocals || 
|-
| rowspan=5| 2012 || rowspan=2| ¿Con Quién Se Queda El Perro? || Album of the Year || 
|-
|| Best Contemporary Pop Album || 
|-
| rowspan=2| "¡Corre!" || Record of the Year || 
|-
| Song of the Year || 
|-
|"Me Voy"||Best Short Form Music Video || 
|-
|2013 || "Llorar" || rowspan=2| Song of the Year|| 
|-
|rowspan=3| 2014 || "Mi Tesoro" || 
|-
| "Dónde está el Amor" || Record of the Year|| 
|-
| Soltando al Perro || Best Long Form Music Video || 
|-
| rowspan=4 | 2016
|rowspan=2|Un Besito Más
|Album of the Year
|
|-
|Best Contemporary Pop Vocal Album
|
|-
|rowspan=2|"Ecos de Amor"
|Record of the Year
|
|-
|Song of the Year
|
|}

References

External links

Official Site
Jesse & Joy's Mini Site (Spanish)
Jesse & Joy On Acceso Total Interview/Acoustic Set (At Hollywood, California)
Jesse & Joy MTV Tr3s Descubre & Download
Q&A Sessions: Jesse & Joy on nocheLatina

Latin Grammy Award for Best New Artist
Mexican pop music groups
Musical groups from Mexico City
Musical groups established in 2005
Mexican people of American descent
Sibling musical duos
Latin Grammy Award winners
Warner Music Latina artists
Latin pop music groups
Grammy Award winners
Folk-pop music groups
Mexican musical duos
Male–female musical duos
Pop music duos